The lists of feature film series vary by their number of entries including;

By number of entries

List of feature film series with more than twenty entries
List of feature film series with 11 to 20 entries
List of feature film series with ten entries
List of feature film series with nine entries
List of feature film series with eight entries
List of feature film series with seven entries
List of feature film series with six entries
List of feature film series with five entries
List of feature film series with four entries
List of feature film series with three entries

By country
List of Indian film series

By franchise
 Category:Lists of films by franchise

See also
List of highest-grossing films#Highest-grossing franchises and film series
List of film serials
List of short film series
List of animated short film series

feature